Michael Emile Telford Miller (16 October 1937 – 11 April 2016), known professionally as Emile Ford, was a musician and singer born in Saint Lucia, British Windward Islands. He was popular in the United Kingdom in the late 1950s and early 1960s as the leader of Emile Ford & the Checkmates, who had a number one hit in late 1959 with "What Do You Want to Make Those Eyes at Me For?", which was the Christmas number one that year. He was also a pioneering sound engineer.

Life and career
Emile Ford was born in Castries, Saint Lucia, in the West Indies. He was the son of Barbadian politician, Frederick Edward Miller, and Madge Murray, a singer and musical theatre director whose father had founded and conducted the St. Lucia Philharmonic Band. His mother married again, taking the name of Sweetnam; some sources erroneously give Emile Ford's birth name as Sweetnam or Sweetman.

He was educated at St Mary’s College, Castries. He moved to London with his mother and family in the mid-1950s, partly motivated by his desire to explore improved sound reproduction technology, and studied at the Paddington Technical College in London. 
It was during this time that he taught himself to play a number of musical instruments, including guitar, piano, violin, bass guitar and drums. Using an abbreviated form of his name, as Emile Ford, he first entered show business at the age of 20, and made his first public performance at The Buttery, Kensington. His first appearance with a backing group was at the Athenaeum Ballroom in Muswell Hill. His TV appearances in 1958 included outings on The Music Shop, the Pearl Carr & Teddy Johnson Show, Oh Boy! and Six-Five Special.

He teamed up in January 1959 with his half-brother, bassist George Sweetnam-Ford (born 1 January 1940, Castries, St. Lucia, British West Indies), electric lead guitarist Ken Street (27 June 1942 – 2 June 1990), sax player Dave Sweetnam-Ford (b. David Sweetnam-Ford, 1939, Castries, St. Lucia, British West Indies) and drummer John Cuffley (born 1939) to form Emile Ford & the Checkmates. The band appeared on the TV programme Sunday Serenade, which ran for six weeks. They won the Soho Fair talent contest in July 1959, but turned down a recording contract with EMI because the company would not allow Ford to produce their records, and instead agreed to a deal with Pye Records.  Their first self-produced recording, "What Do You Want to Make Those Eyes at Me For?", a song originally recorded by Ada Jones and Billy Murray in 1917, went to number one in the UK Singles Chart at the end of 1959 and stayed there for six weeks.
Ford was the first Black British artist to sell one million copies of a single.

In January 1960, Ford signed a two-year employment management contract with Leslie Grade. He had several more hits in the UK, and also scored a number one EP in 1960. The readers of the British music magazine New Musical Express voted Emile Ford & the Checkmates as the "Best New Act" in 1960. Ford's debut album was made up of covers. He made several albums, but his last studio recordings were in 1963. His half-brothers George and Dave Sweetnam-Ford were later members of the Ferris Wheel.

Counting Teardrops, an anthology including all of Ford's recordings with Pye Records, was released in 2001.

Interpretation of sound
Ford, like Jimi Hendrix, had synaesthesia, a condition where the person who can associate certain colours, or even see certain colours in relation to the sound they are hearing.  An article about Emile Ford appears in the November 2004 issue of the UK Synaesthesia Association Newsletter. He once said that he was gifted with the ability to see and hear sound differently from others and that gift allowed him to make first-class recordings.

Backing
The female singers that backed him were originally called The Fordettes. They consisted of Margot Quantrell, Eleanor Russell, Vicki Haseman and Betty Prescott. They spent a year on the road with Ford in 1960, playing one-nighters. Back in London they left Ford to sing backup for Joe Brown who Vicki Haseman was engaged to. They were then known as The Breakaways.

Audio engineering
As a sound engineer, Ford was responsible for creating a backing track system for stage shows, first used in 1960, which provided a basis for what became known as karaoke. In 1969, he set up a recording studio in Barbados with the help of his father, before moving to Sweden. While there, he further developed a new open-air playback system for stage shows, patented as the Liveoteque Sound Frequency Feedback Injection System.

Death
Emile Ford died in London on 11 April 2016.

Discography

See also
List of artists who reached number one on the UK Singles Chart
List of number-one singles from the 1950s (UK)
UK No.1 Hits of 1959
UK No.1 Hits of 1960
List of Christmas number one singles (UK)
List of number-one singles in Australia during the 1960s
List of artists who reached number one on the Australian singles chart

References

External links
 Emile Ford & the Checkmates story at the 45-rpm Website
 Website including 2002 radio interview and excerpt from interview with Norman Joplin
 Emile Ford obituary at theguardian.com
 Emile Ford, singer – obituary at telegraph.co.uk
 Web-Fi Sound: A website with a info about Emile Ford
 Video of Ford live in Sweden in later years

1937 births
2016 deaths
Male pop singers
Saint Lucian male singers
Saint Lucian emigrants to the United Kingdom
20th-century Black British male singers
British rock and roll musicians
Saint Lucian people of Barbadian descent
People from Castries Quarter